Melvin Keith Aldridge (born July 22, 1970) is a former gridiron football linebacker and defensive back who played in the National Football League, the Canadian Football League, and the World League of American Football. He played college football at Tyler Junior College and for the Murray State Racers. After playing in one game for the Houston Oilers and two games for the Arizona Cardinals, Aldridge played in the CFL. He made 45 tackles in 11 games for the Ottawa Rough Riders and the Hamilton Tiger-Cats.

References

External links 
Melvin Aldridge on Just Sports Stats

1970 births
Living people
American football linebackers
American football defensive backs
Canadian football linebackers
Canadian football defensive backs
Tyler Apaches football players
Murray State Racers football players
Houston Oilers players
Arizona Cardinals players
Amsterdam Admirals players
Ottawa Rough Riders players
London Monarchs players
Hamilton Tiger-Cats players
Players of Canadian football from Texas
Players of American football from Texas
People from Mount Pleasant, Texas